Lenghu is a town in Mangnai, Haixi Mongol and Tibetan Autonomous Prefecture. It is located in the northwest of Qinghai province, China, bordering Gansu to the north/northeast and Xinjiang to the northwest.

History
In 2018, the Mangnai and Lenghu administrative zones merged to established the county-level city of Mangnai.

Geography
Lenghu borders Da Qaidam to the east, Mangnai to the west, Aksai Kazakh Autonomous County (Gansu) to the north, and Ruoqiang County (Xinjiang) to the northwest, and is part of the northwestern Qaidam Basin in an area dotted frequently by yardangs.

Climate
As with most of northwestern Qinghai, Lenghu has an arid climate (Köppen BWk), with long, cold winters, and warm summers. It is the driest locale in the country, with only  of precipitation annually, and it is not uncommon for months to pass by without any rainfall, though underground water resources are plentiful. The area is also extremely sunny; with monthly percent possible sunshine ranging from 72% in July to 85% in October, the area receives 3,443 hours of bright sunshine annually.

References

Haixi Mongol and Tibetan Autonomous Prefecture